State Route 108 (SR 108) is a state highway in the U.S. state of California that runs from the Central Valley and across the Sierra Nevada via the Sonora Pass. It generally runs northeast from downtown Modesto near the SR 99/SR 132 interchange, to U.S. Route 395 near the Nevada state line. The route was once recommended to continue south of Modesto to Interstate 5, although today that portion exists as a county road. Parts of SR 108 are closed annually during the winter due to inclement weather along the summit.

Route description
State Route 108 begins in downtown Modesto at the junction of SR 99 and SR 132, overlapping SR 132 for several blocks northeast on L Street to 9th Street. There it splits into a short one-way pair, with eastbound SR 108 turning southeast with SR 132 on 9th Street to K Street and then northeast to Needham Street; the westbound direction remains on L Street to Needham Street. After several blocks eastward on Needham Street, SR 108 reaches McHenry Avenue, which it follows north out of the city.  There is no route marker eastbound indicating where the route turns left from 9th Street to K Street, nor is there a route marker indicating where the westbound traffic turns left from Needham Street to L Street.

From Modesto, SR 108 runs north along McHenry Avenue for about  before turning eastward on Patterson Road to follow the Stanislaus River east-northeast. In Riverbank, County Route J7 comes from the north and departs to the south after about a one-mile (1.6 km) co-routing.

At the main intersection in Oakdale, SR 120 joins SR 108 from the north and they are co-signed as they continue northeast, climbing into the foothills and passing just south of Knights Ferry. SR 120 brings with it the title Northern Yosemite Highway for this segment; with State Route 140 being the middle route from the west and State Route 41 being the southern route to Yosemite. This is advantageous as steep grade is located along this stretch of the road and the extra lanes are useful as passing lanes both ascending and descending the mountain range. About a mile after the end of the separated pavement, La Grange Road (County road J59) heads south, passing just west of Lake Don Pedro and meeting SR 132 near the town of La Grange. Another  eastward, at Yosemite Junction, SR 120 finally separates from SR 108 and heads southward toward to a co-routing with State Route 49 through Chinese Camp and across the upper end of Lake Don Pedro.

Another  eastward, SR 49 joins from the south and is co-routed with SR 108 through Jamestown and into Sonora, where SR 49 departs to the north.  SR 108 continues eastward and gains elevation as it passes through Twain Harte, Mi-Wuk Village, Long Barn, Cold Springs, Strawberry-Pinecrest Lake and Dodge Ridge Ski Area, then on to Dardanelle and Kennedy Meadow. SR 108 passes through Alpine County for approximately 0.8 miles immediately west of the Sonora Pass. At the pass, the highway crosses the summit of the Sierra Nevada and enters Mono County, then descends past the Mountain Warfare Training Center at Pickel Meadows, finally reaching the eastern terminus at Sonora Junction where it meets U.S. Route 395. Sonora Pass usually closes during the winter months, often from November through as late as May.

SR 108 is part of the California Freeway and Expressway System, and west of the eastern junction with SR 49 is part of the National Highway System, a network of highways that are considered essential to the country's economy, defense, and mobility by the Federal Highway Administration. SR 108 is eligible to be included in the State Scenic Highway System, but it is not officially designated as a scenic highway by the California Department of Transportation.

Major intersections

See also

References

External links

Caltrans: Route 108 Road Conditions
California Highways: Route 108
AARoads: State Route 108

108
State Route 108
State Route 108
State Route 108
Transportation in Modesto, California